The Naval Infantry Command, also known as the Naval Infantry of the Navy of the Argentine Republic and generally referred to in English as the Argentine marines are the amphibious warfare branch of the Argentine Navy and one of its four operational commands.

The Argentine marines trace their origins to the Spanish Naval Infantry, which took part in conflicts in South America in the eighteenth and nineteenth centuries. Argentine marines took part in various conflicts of the nineteenth and twentieth century, notably the War of the Triple Alliance and the Falklands War. The marines (represented by the 5th Naval Infantry Battalion) are considered to have been among the best Argentine combat units present in the Falklands. The most recent war in which Argentine naval infantry took part was the Gulf War of 1990.

Today Argentine naval infantry are frequently deployed on UN peace-keeping missions.

History 
The Marines trace their origins in Spanish Naval Infantry, at the time of the Viceroyalty of the Río de la Plata. After the Argentine War of Independence, it was under joint administration of the Argentine Army and the Argentine Navy. A 1946 law placed the marines solely under the jurisdiction of the Navy.

List of conflicts involving Argentina Marines 

 Spanish rule 
 Falklands Crisis of 1770.
 Spanish–Portuguese War (1776–1777).
 British invasions of the River Plate.

 Independence 
 Argentine War of Independence.

 Argentine Confederation 
 Cisplatine War.
 Uruguayan Civil War.
 Anglo-French blockade of the Río de la Plata.
 Paraguayan War.

 Argentine Republic 
 1963 Argentine Navy revolt.
 Snipe incident.
 Dirty War.
 Falklands War.
 1982 invasion of the Falkland Islands.
 Invasion of South Georgia.
 Battle of Mount Tumbledown.
 Gulf War. 
 United Nations peacekeeping.
 United Nations Peacekeeping Force in Cyprus.
 United Nations Protection Force.
 United Nations Stabilisation Mission in Haiti.
 United Nations Mission for the Referendum in Western Sahara.

Present 

IMARA routinely train in joint exercises with similar units of Brazil, Chile and the United States. However, as of 2021 component battalions were reported to be at about 60 percent of their authorized strength levels due to lack of personnel and resources.

Current deployments 

IMARA had two companies as part of the Argentinian battalions in Cyprus (UNFICYP, 1992 to 2003) and Haiti (MINUSTAH, 2004 to 2015). The former remains as a platoon-size unit as a consequence of the missions downsizing, and the latter finished its tour in 2015. A small platoon was also deployed in Serbia/UN Province Kosovo (NATO KFOR mandate), attached to Argentine Engineers Company, which was in turn attached to the Italian Brigade.

A few marines officers are routinely deployed as military observers for the UN.

Structure 
Argentine Marines have the same rank insignia and titles as the rest of the Argentine Navy, and are trained in the same institutions for officers and NCOs. Until the 21st century the Marine Corps Basic School provided post-graduate officer and basic enlisted training.

Fleet Marine Force (FAIF) 
The FMF was formerly called the Brigada de IM No. 1
 2nd Marine Corps Battalion
 1st Amphibious Vehicles Battalion
 Amphibious Engineers Battalion
 Command and Logistical Support Battalion
 1st Communications Battalion
 1st Field Artillery Battalion
 Anti-aircraft artillery Battalion
 Amphibious Commandos Group (APCA)

Southern Marine Force (FAIA) 
The SMF was formerly called the Fuerza de M No. 1. (English: 1st Marine Force)
 4th Marine Corps Battalion
 5th Marine Corps Battalion
 Naval Detachment Río Grande

River Operations Unit 
 3rd Marine Corps Battalion

Marine Security Forces 
 Navy General Staff Security Battalion
 Puerto Belgrano Naval Base Security Battalion
 15 Security Companies assigned to naval bases, Naval Air Stations, and Marine bases

Ranks
Officers

Enlisted

Equipment

See also 

Argentine ground forces in the Falklands War
Argentine Navy
Marines
Military history of Argentina

References

External links 

 
 Official website (archived)
 Argentine Marines Unofficial website
 Organization and equipment
 Argentine Marine Corps Association
 Argentine Marine Fallen in Malvinas
World Navies
As part of his journey of reconciliation Mike Seers travels to Argentina to interview Marine artillery gunners whom he fought against
Reassessing the Fighting Performance of the Argentine 5th Marines

Argentina
Marines
Military units and formations established in 1939

da:ARA